Halysidota brasiliensis is a moth of the family Erebidae. It was described by Walter Rothschild in 1909. It is found in Paraguay and the south-eastern Brazilian states of Bahia, São Paulo, Paraná, Rio de Janeiro and Rio Grande do Sul.

The larvae feed on Phrygilanthus acutifolius and Trema micrantha.

References

Halysidota
Moths described in 1909